is an anime television series co-produced by Chukyo TV and animation studio Sublimation. The series is chief directed by Shinya Sugai, directed by Gō Kurosaki, and features character designs by Manabu Nakatake. The series aired from October to December 2021.

Characters

Media

Anime
The series was announced by Chukyo TV and CG studio Sublimation on October 1, 2018. Shinya Sugai is chief directing the series, with Gō Kurosaki serving as director, Tomoyasu Nishimura serving as producer, Manabu Nakatake adapting Ryōga Inoue's character designs for animation, and Takumi Saitou composing the music and directing the sound. It is scheduled to consist of twelve 30-minute episodes. The series aired from October 10 to December 26, 2021. Asaka performed the series' opening theme song "BELIEVE MYSELF", while May'n performed the series' ending theme song "Shikizakura". Sentai Filmworks licensed the series.

Episode list

Manga
A manga adaptation written and illustrated by Hayato Aoki began serialization in the February 2021 issue of Futabasha's Monthly Action magazine on December 25, 2020.

Notes

References

External links
  
 

2021 anime television series debuts
Anime with original screenplays
Futabasha manga
Nippon TV original programming
Science fiction anime and manga
Seinen manga
Sentai Filmworks